"The Great Gig in the Sky" is the fifth track on The Dark Side of the Moon, a 1973 album by the English progressive rock band Pink Floyd.  The song features music by keyboard player Richard Wright and wordless vocals by session singer Clare Torry. It is one of only three Pink Floyd songs to feature vocals from an outside artist. The Great Gig in the Sky was released as a digital single in February 2023 to promote The Dark Side of the Moon 50th Anniversary box set.

Composition

The song began as a Richard Wright chord progression which was known as "The Mortality Sequence" or "The Religion Song".
During the first half of 1972 it was performed live as a simple organ instrumental, accompanied by spoken-word samples from the Bible and snippets of speeches by Malcolm Muggeridge, a British writer known for his conservative religious views.
By September 1972, the lead instrument had been switched to a piano, with an arrangement very similar to the final form but without vocals, and with a slightly different chord sequence in the middle.
Various sound effects were tried over the track, including recordings of NASA astronauts communicating on space missions, but none was satisfactory.
Finally, a couple of weeks before the album was due to be finished, the band thought of having a female singer "wail" over the music.

Clare Torry's vocals
The band began casting around for a singer, and studio engineer Alan Parsons suggested Clare Torry, a 25-year-old songwriter and session vocalist he had worked with on a Top of The Pops covers album. Torry was contacted to arrange a session for the same evening but she had other commitments, including tickets to see Chuck Berry, so a three-hour session was scheduled for the following Sunday.

The band played the instrumental track to Torry and asked her to improvise a vocal. At first she struggled to find what was needed, but then she was inspired to sing as if she were an instrument herself. Torry performed two complete takes, the second more emotional than the first, but when David Gilmour asked for a third take she stopped halfway through, feeling that she was getting repetitive and had already done the best she could. The final album track was assembled from all three takes. The members of the band were deeply impressed by Torry's performance but did not tell her this, and she left the studio, with a standard £30 flat fee, under the impression that her vocals would not make the final cut. She only became aware that she had been included in the final mix when she picked up the album at a local record store and saw her name in the credits. In 2005, an undisclosed out-of-court settlement in Torry's favour included giving her vocal composition credit.

Quotes from those involved

Chris Thomas, who was brought in to assist Alan Parsons in mixing the album, mentions that they were actually in mixdown at the time. On the DVD Classic Albums: Pink Floyd – The Making of The Dark Side of the Moon, various members mention that they had this song and were not sure what to do with it. Wright recalls that when Torry finished, she was apologetic about her performance, even though those present were amazed at her improvisation.

Lawsuit
In 2004, Torry sued Pink Floyd and EMI for songwriting royalties, on the basis that her contribution to "Great Gig in the Sky" constituted co-authorship with Richard Wright. Originally, she had been paid the standard Sunday flat studio rate of £30. In 2005, prior to a hearing in the High Court, an out-of-court settlement was reached. Although the terms of the settlement were not disclosed, on all pressings after 2005 the composition is co-credited to both Richard Wright and Clare Torry.

Spoken parts

On Classic Albums: Pink Floyd – The Making of The Dark Side of the Moon, it is stated that during the recording of the album, in which death and life had been a consistent theme, the members of the band went around asking questions and recording responses from people working inside Abbey Road at the time. Among the questions, they were asked "Are you afraid of dying?". The responses of doorman Gerry O'Driscoll and the wife of their road manager Peter Watts were used, as well as other spoken parts throughout the album ("I've always been mad", "That geezer was cruisin' for a bruisin").

(At 0:39)

(At 3:33, faintly)

Reception
In a contemporary review for The Dark Side of the Moon, Lloyd Grossman of Rolling Stone described "The Great Gig in the Sky" as a track [Pink Floyd] could have "shortened or dispensed with". Almost forty years later, in a readers' poll from the same magazine, the track was selected as the second greatest vocal performance of all time behind "Bohemian Rhapsody".

Live performances

Pink Floyd 
An early incarnation of the song, titled "The Mortality Sequence" and lacking the vocals later contributed by Clare Torry, was performed by Pink Floyd throughout 1972. In its final version, "The Great Gig in the Sky" was performed live from 1973 to 1975, and from 1987 to 1994.

During the band's 1974–1975 tour, David Gilmour played both pedal steel guitar and the Hammond organ, allowing Richard Wright to concentrate solely on piano (his keyboards were positioned where he could not play both). Gilmour's pedal steel for "Great Gig" was accordingly located beside Wright's Hammond. Vocal duties were handled by Venetta Fields and Carlena Williams, both former members of the Blackberries. The 16 November 1974 performance can be found in the Experience 2-CD and Immersion box set editions of The Dark Side of the Moon.

Starting in 1987, additional touring keyboardist Jon Carin took over the Hammond parts. Up to three singers performed the vocals, each taking different parts of the song. On the Delicate Sound of Thunder video, with footage from June and August 1988, the vocals are shared by Rachel Fury, Durga McBroom and Margret Taylor. Clare Torry performed the song in the Knebworth 1990 concert, released in 2021 live album Live at Knebworth 1990.

The 1994 live album P•U•L•S•E features a version sung by Sam Brown, Durga McBroom and Claudia Fontaine. When the Floyd's manager, Steve O'Rourke, died in 2003, Gilmour, Wright, and Mason played "Fat Old Sun" and "The Great Gig in the Sky" at his funeral. McBroom said Richard Wright liked her version best, and as he had requested, she sang it at Wright's funeral.

Roger Waters 
Torry joined Roger Waters to perform the song live during three dates of K.A.O.S. On the Road in 1987. In the 1999 leg of Waters' In the Flesh tour, only the piano intro was played between Breathe (reprise) and Money.

In the 2006–08 The Dark Side of the Moon Live tour, The Dark Side of the Moon was played in its entirety and the song was performed by Carol Kenyon. "The Great Gig in the Sky" made a return in Us + Them Tour (2017–18), performed by Jess Wolfe and Holly Laessig and documented in the concert film and live album Roger Waters: Us + Them (2019).

David Gilmour 
The song was occasionally performed in the final legs of Rattle That Lock Tour, most notably in the Amphitheatre of Pompeii on 7 and 8 July 2016, with Lucita Jules, Louise Clare Marshall and Bryan Chambers sharing the vocals. The Pompeii performance is part of Gilmour's Live at Pompeii live album and film.

Commercial re-use 
A short clip of the song was used in a 1974 TV advertisement for Dole bananas. A re-recorded version was used as the backing music in a UK television advertisement for the analgesic Nurofen in 1990. The band was not involved in this version, but Clare Torry again did the vocal with Rick Wright on keyboards, Neil Conti on drums and Lati Kronlund on bass. Gilmour said he did not approve of its use, but that Wright, as the writer, had the rights.

Personnel
David Gilmour – pedal steel guitar
Richard Wright – piano, Hammond organ
Roger Waters – bass
Nick Mason – drums

with:

Clare Torry – vocals

Charts

Weekly charts

Certifications

References
Footnotes

Citations

Bibliography

 
 
 
 
 

1973 songs
Pink Floyd songs
The Flaming Lips songs
Peaches (musician) songs
Rock instrumentals
Songs about death
Songs written by Richard Wright (musician)
Song recordings produced by David Gilmour
Song recordings produced by Roger Waters
Song recordings produced by Richard Wright (musician)
Song recordings produced by Nick Mason